Anne Enger, formerly Anne Enger Lahnstein (born 9 December 1949), is a Norwegian politician who served as County Governor of Østfold from 2004 until 2015, and Leader of the Centre Party from 1991 to 1999, with opposition to the European Union. She was the front person of the successful "No to EU" campaign at the 1994 referendum. She was also the leader in the failed campaign against elective abortion in Norway in the late 1970s.

She served as Minister of Culture 1997–2000; and for three weeks in 1998, she was Acting Prime Minister of Norway, during Kjell Magne Bondevik's sick leave.

References
 Biography on Norwegian government's website 

|-

|-

|-

1949 births
20th-century Norwegian politicians
20th-century Norwegian women politicians
21st-century Norwegian politicians
21st-century Norwegian women politicians
County governors of Norway
Living people
Ministers of Culture of Norway
Prime Ministers of Norway
Women prime ministers
Women government ministers of Norway